= Covin =

French legal term

Covin (from the French covine, or couvine, from Latin convenire, to come together), an association of persons, so used in the Statute of Labourers of 1360, which, inter alia, declared void "all alliances and covins of stonemasons and carpenters".

The more common use of the term in English law was for a secret agreement between persons to cheat and defraud, but the word is now obsolete and has been superseded by "collusion" or "conspiracy to cheat and defraud".
